Victoria Sun-hei Lee (May 17, 2004 – December 26, 2022) was an American mixed martial artist who competed in ONE Championship.

Early life 
Victoria Sun-hei Lee was born in Wahiawa, Hawaii, on May 17, 2004, the daughter of Korean-Canadian mother Jewelz Lee and Chinese-Singaporean father Ken Lee. She was the younger sister of fellow MMA fighters Angela Lee and Christian Lee.

Career
Lee was a two-time Hawaiian Pankration Junior World Champion, Hawaii State Wrestling Champion, and IMMAF Junior World Champion. She trained at United MMA Gym in Hawaii under her brother-in-law Bruno Pucci and was supported by Evolve MMA.

On September 30, 2020, at the age of 16, Lee signed a contract to fight in the Atomweight division of the ONE Championship, becoming its youngest fighter. On February 26, 2021, she made her first fight in the ONE Championship 129: Fists Of Fury event, where she defeated Sunisa Srisan in the second round via rear naked choke.

On July 30, 2021, she made her second fight against Wang Luping in the ONE Championship 139: Battleground event, which she won by submission with a triangle armbar in the first round.

Lee faced Victoria Souza at ONE Championship 143: Revolution on September 24, 2021. She won the bout in the second round via ground and pound.

In 2022, Lee paused her MMA career to focus on graduating from high school. She was slated to return with a bout against Zeba Bano at ONE Fight Night 6 in Bangkok on January 14, 2023.

Death 
Lee died in Hawaii on December 26, 2022, at the age of 18, but her death was not revealed until her older sister Angela announced it via Instagram on January 7, 2023. A cause of death has not been given. The Lees shut down their family-owned MMA training facility in Waipahu, Hawaii, and said it would remain permanently closed.

Achievements 
 2020 Pankration Junior World Champion, Hawaii (−57 kg)

 2019 Pankration Junior World Champion, Hawaii (−57 kg)

 2019 IMMAF Wrestling Junior World Champion, Hawaii (−57 kg)

 2020 IMMAF Wrestling Junior State Champion, Hawaii (−57 kg)

Mixed martial arts record 

|-
|Win
|align=center|3–0
|Victória Souza
|TKO (punches)
|ONE Championship 143: Revolution
|
|align=center|2
|align=center|3:58
|Kallang, Singapore
|
|-
|Win
|align=center|2–0
|Wang Luping
|Submission (triangle armbar)
|ONE Championship 139: Battleground
|
|align=center|1		
|align=center|3:22
|Kallang, Singapore
|
|-
|Win
|align=center|1–0
|Sunisa Srisan
|Submission (rear-naked choke)
|ONE Championship 129: Fists Of Fury
|
|align=center|2
|align=center|1:03
|Kallang, Singapore
|
|-

See also 
 List of current ONE fighters

References

External links 

 Victoria Lee at ONE Championship
 
 
 

2004 births
2022 deaths
Atomweight mixed martial artists
Strawweight mixed martial artists
Canadian female mixed martial artists
Canadian practitioners of Brazilian jiu-jitsu
Canadian people of Chinese descent
Canadian people of Korean descent
Canadian people of Singaporean descent
American female mixed martial artists
American practitioners of Brazilian jiu-jitsu
American people of Chinese descent
American people of Korean descent
American people of Singaporean descent
Female Brazilian jiu-jitsu practitioners
Mixed martial artists from Hawaii
Mixed martial artists utilizing taekwondo
Mixed martial artists utilizing Muay Thai
Mixed martial artists utilizing pankration
Mixed martial artists utilizing wrestling
Mixed martial artists utilizing Brazilian jiu-jitsu
Sportspeople from Hawaii
Singaporean female mixed martial artists
21st-century American women